Raphael Kirchner (1876 – 2 August 1917) was an Austrian artist, principally a portrait painter and illustrator best known for Art Nouveau and early pin-up work, especially in picture postcard format. His work served as an early inspiration to Peruvian painter Alberto Vargas, who had a career in the United States for the film and men's magazine industry.

Early life
Kirchner was born in 1876 in Vienna, Austria, and attended the Academy of Fine Arts Vienna. He moved to Paris in the year 1900, making illustrations for such magazines as La Vie Parisienne.

In 1914, at the outbreak of World War I, Kirchner moved to the United States. He lived in New York City until his death in 1917.

Work

Raphael Kirchner produced over a thousand published paintings and drawings in his lifetime, mostly in the form of picture postcards. His orientalist "Geisha" series was among his most popular, with over 40,000 cards sold. The series is a notable example of the cross-influence between Art Nouveau in the West and Japanese art of the Meiji and Taishō periods.  Kirchner's often mildly erotic paintings of feminine beauty, in convenient postcard and magazine page form, were among the early pin-ups favored by European and American soldiers in World War I.

Peruvian painter Alberto Vargas cited Kirchner as an influence, and was noted for his own paintings of beautiful women in a related style. He painted for movie posters and later illustrations in men's magazines.

Kirchner's lasting influence on the pin-up genre was still recognized in the World War II pin-up heyday period.  Kirchner also produced a small number of sculptures, some of which were photographed for postcards as well.  In New York, he also produced costume designs for musical theatre productions.

See also
List of Orientalist artists
Orientalism

References

Links

1875 births
1917 deaths
Postcard artists
19th-century Austrian painters
19th-century Austrian male artists
20th-century Austrian painters
Academy of Fine Arts Vienna alumni
Art Nouveau painters
Art Nouveau illustrators
Artists from Vienna
Austrian male painters
Austrian erotic artists
Austrian illustrators
Austrian emigrants to France
Austro-Hungarian emigrants to the United States
Orientalist painters
Austro-Hungarian expatriates in France
20th-century Austrian male artists